Sunspot is an unincorporated community in the Sacramento Mountains in the Lincoln National Forest in Otero County, New Mexico, United States, about  south of Cloudcroft. The Sunspot Solar Observatory and Apache Point Observatory are located in Sunspot in the Sacramento Mountains. The site of Sunspot is leased by the National Science Foundation (NSF) from the US Forest Service (USFS), and is operated and maintained by the Association of Universities for Research in Astronomy. The telescope and site are both open to the public, and the visitors center offers guided tours of the site on Saturdays and Sundays. On other days there is a self-guided 1/2 mile trail around the telescope and White Sands overlook.

History
It was named after the presence of the National Solar Observatory on Sacramento Peak, in a vote that was allegedly rigged by the observatory's director John Evans. The road leading to Sunspot from Cloudcroft is New Mexico State Road 6563, named for the brightest wavelength of hydrogen emission, H-alpha. This scenic byway features signposts marking the relative locations of the planets from the sun in proportion to their distance to Sunspot.

Temporary closure and conspiracies

On September 6, 2018, AURA voluntarily evacuated the site of Sunspot for security reasons. This prompted the formation of multiple conspiracies ranging from Aliens to military intelligence operations to impending solar storms to FBI raids. These all originated from false information provided by the local sheriff.
A local TV station provided a call-in from a supposed employee with a disguised voice, although this was later found to be faked by the reporter. On September 17 AURA re-opened Sunspot, following an investigation into criminal activity involving Apache Point Observatory personnel. Later, court documents reported that the closure was due to threats from the Apache Point Observatory janitor who was subsequently the center of a federal investigation. During the course of the investigation, AURA had decided to evacuate the site and terminated the contract that had been held by the janitor. Apache Point Observatory had not been closed despite the ongoing presence of the suspect at that location during the investigation. The suspect was known by a few others who had been previously removed from Sunspot, or fired. Once the threat was no longer present, Sunspot was reopened by AURA.

Education
It is zoned to Cloudcroft Municipal Schools.

See also

 Sunspot Solar Observatory
 National Solar Observatory
 Apache Point Observatory

References

External links

Unincorporated communities in Otero County, New Mexico
Unincorporated communities in New Mexico